Mordellistena longipes is a species of beetle in the genus Mordellistena of the family Mordellidae, which is part of the superfamily Tenebrionoidea. It was described in 1895 by Lea. It is known from Australia.

References

Beetles described in 1895
longipes